Dmitriyevka (Salazan) is a rural locality (a selo) in Dmitriyevskoye Rural Settlement of Turochaksky District, the Altai Republic, Russia. The population was 607 as of 2016. There are 6 streets.

Geography 
Dmitriyevka is located 32 km north of Turochak (the district's administrative centre) by road. Shunarak is the nearest rural locality.

References 

Rural localities in Turochaksky District